Danial Esmaeilifar (born February 26, 1993) is an Iranian footballer who plays for Iranian club Persepolis in the Persian Gulf Pro League.

Club career

Payam Sanat Amol
He started his career in the Padideh Sari youth levels. After years in Padideye Sari Academy he joined Payam Sanat Amol in Division 3 and helped them gain promotion to Division 2. In his second season at Payam Sanat Amol he shone in the Hazfi Cup but he could not prevent Payam Sanat Amol's relegation.

Zob Ahan
After shining in a match against Zob Ahan in the Hazfi Cup he was admitted by Zob Ahan's scouts. Finally he joined Zob Ahan in summer 2014. He made his debut for Zob Ahan in their first fixture of the 2014–15 Iran Pro League against Saba Qom as a starter. He scored his first goal for the club on 10 April 2015 in a 1–1 draw against Esteghlal.

Tractor 
In 2018–19 season he joined Tractor and played in 42 league matches for the team.

Sepahan
After good appearances in Zob Ahan, he joined Sepahan in summer of 2020.

Persepolis
On 8 June 2022, Esmaeilifar joined Persian Gulf Pro League side Persepolis on a two-year deal.

Career statistics

Assists

Honours
Payam Sanat Amol
Football's 3rd Division (1): 2012–13

Zob Ahan
Hazfi Cup (2): 2014–15, 2015–16
Iranian Super Cup (1): 2016

References

External links 

 Danial Esmaeilifar at IranLeague.ir

1993 births
Living people
Zob Ahan Esfahan F.C. players
Iranian footballers
People from Sari, Iran
Association football midfielders
Sportspeople from Sari, Iran
Persepolis F.C. players
Persian Gulf Pro League players